Huddersfield Town's 1984–85 campaign was a mediocre season for the Terriers, with the team finishing in 13th place, never looking likely to be promoted or relegated.

Squad at the start of the season

Review
Town didn't have the best start in their second season back in Division 2. By mid-October, Town were second bottom, following only winning one of their first 9 league games. But, a stunning turn in form saw Town go on a run of 9 games unbeaten, of which 8 of those were wins, helped by goals from Mark Lillis and Dale Tempest. That run saw Town climb to 9th in early December.

Following that run, Town lost 5 of the next 7, winning the other 2, but then a run of 9 games unbeaten seemed to try to force Town into a late promotion surge, but this was quickly ended by a dreadful late season run, which saw Town lose 6 of their last 8 games, finishing in a mediocre 13th place.

Squad at the end of the season

Results

Division Two

FA Cup

League Cup

Appearances and goals

References

1984-85
English football clubs 1984–85 season